Roaf is a surname. Notable people with the name include:

 Andree Layton Roaf (1941–2009), member of Arkansas Supreme Court
 Michael Roaf (contemporary), British orientalist
 Susan Roaf (born 1950s), British Professor of Architectural Engineering
 Willie Roaf (born 1970), American football player